Peter David Sullivan (born 1948) is an Australian former national representative rugby union player. He represented for New South Wales and Australia, captaining the national side on eleven occasions from 1972 to 1973.

Early life & rugby
Sullivan was schooled at Chatswood Boys High School and played his early rugby at the Forest Rugby Club in Forestville. His senior rugby started in Wollongong and in his first season of first grade and scarcely eighteen he was selected for the Illawarra region and from there he was selected for New South Wales after just six senior games. Howell writes that following state selection at such a young age, he found himself a marked man at club level and "injuries followed, his form deteriorated and his confidence with it"  He did not represent again until 1970. In the mid 1970s he coached and was Physical Education teacher at Glenwood Boys High School in Durban South Africa.

Representative career
In 1969 Sullivan relocated to Sydney and joined the Gordon Rugby Club. He spent some time in reserve grade in that first season in Sydney first grade but in 1970 he regained his state position in a match against Scotland and he represented for Sydney against those same visitors.

In 1971 Sullivan appeared for New South Wales against the visiting British Lions and later that year when South Africa also toured, Sullivan was selected to meet them for Sydney, New South Wales and in three Test matches for  Australia. He made the 1971 Australia rugby union tour of France and played in both Test matches, experiencing his first Wallaby victory in the first Test.

In 1972 he played in both home Test matches against the visiting French and he toured under captain Greg Davis on the 1972 Australia rugby union tour of New Zealand and Fiji. He was injured and had to be replaced in the games against North Otago and in the first Test match. Howell writes that the seven loss & five win result of the tour was "a disaster and occasioned Davis' retirement". An injury picked up in New Zealand prevented Davis from leading the side in the Test match in Fiji on the way home and Sullivan debuted as an Australian Test captain in the Wallabies' narrow 21–19 victory against Fiji. He had already captained the side in two mid-week games during the New Zealand leg.

In 1973 Peter Sullivan retained the Test captaincy in the two Test series against Tonga and was at the helm in the 2nd Test boil-over when Tonga got up 16–11. Howell writes of this period as "the lowest ever point of Australian rugby". He led the Wallabies on the 1973 Australia rugby union tour of Europe, and played in six of the nine matches including the Test loss against Wales. He was injured and did not take the field in the test against England, where the Wallabies were captained by John Hipwell.

All told Sullivan captained the Wallabies in four Tests through 1972–1973 and in nine tour matches. He played twenty-eight matches for Australia, thirteen of them Tests. Howell writes that he was "a vigorous, aggressive player who played to the maximum when wearing the green and gold".

Rugby league career
Keen to secure his family's financial future Sullivan signed a five-year contract with the St George Dragons at the end of the 1973 season. He managed only one first grade game before a serious knee injury ended his playing days.

Career summary

Test matches
Playing for Australia

Legend : Y : Year, M : Test Matches Played, S : Starts, P : Points, T : Tries, W : Won, L : Lost, D : Drawn

References

External links
Profile at Scrum.com

Published sources
 Howell, Max (2005) Born to Lead – Wallaby Test Captains, Celebrity Books, Auckland NZ
 Whiticker, Alan & Hudson, Glen (2006) The Encyclopedia of Rugby League Players, Gavin Allen Publishing, Sydney

1948 births
Living people
Australian rugby league players
Australian rugby union players
Australian rugby union captains
Australia international rugby union players
Rugby union flankers
Rugby union players from Newcastle, New South Wales